The Supercopa de España is an annual Spanish football competition.

Supercopa de España or Spanish Super Cup may also refer to:

Supercopa de España de Baloncesto, basketball
Supercopa de España de Balonmano or Supercopa ASOBAL, handball
Supercopa de España de Futsal, futsal
Supercopa de España de Hockey Patines, roller hockey
Supercopa de España de Rugby, rugby
Supercopa de España de Voleibol, volleyball
Supercopa de España de Waterpolo, water polo
Supercopa de España Femenina, women's football
Supercopa de España de Baloncesto Femenino, women's basketball

See also
Copa del Rey (disambiguation)